One District One Product (ODOP) is an initiative by the Government of Uttar Pradesh to encourage state's domestic production of various handicrafts, readymade clothes, leather products etc. The aim of state government is to encourage indigenous and specialized products district wise.

By helping cottage and small industries, UP government is helping local workers to increase their income through branding of their products. The schemes has helped many handicrafts workers to get employment and boost the economy of Uttar Pradesh.

The Government of Uttar Pradesh has implemented this programme in all 75 districts of Uttar Pradesh. The programme is praised not domestically but also at international level and got success.

Various products produced under the scheme of ODOP, were gifted to World leader in respective bilateral meetings and well praised by them. During G20 presidency by India, several handicrafts were distributed among world leaders to promote Indian handicrafts.

Launch 
The mission was launched by Chief Minister Yogi Adityanath in January 2018, to promote state's handicrafts and to help handicrafts workers financially.

District wise products 
Source: ODOP - Government of Uttar Pradesh

References 

Government schemes in Uttar Pradesh
Economy of Uttar Pradesh